Aigars Prūsis (born January 5, 1976 in Liepāja) was the leader of Latvia's National Power Union, a far-right nationalist political party, in 2003–2006.

He ran latvians.lv, an Internet portal for far-right Latvian nationalist groups.

References

1976 births
Living people
Politicians from Liepāja
21st-century Latvian politicians